Alain Côté (born 22 September 1963) is a Canadian fencer. He competed at the 1984, 1988 and 1992 Summer Olympics.

References

External links
 

1963 births
Living people
Canadian male fencers
Olympic fencers of Canada
Fencers at the 1984 Summer Olympics
Fencers at the 1988 Summer Olympics
Fencers at the 1992 Summer Olympics
Sportspeople from Quebec
People from Saint-Jérôme
Pan American Games medalists in fencing
Fencers at the 1983 Pan American Games
Medalists at the 1983 Pan American Games
Pan American Games gold medalists for Canada